Harthacnut ("Tough-knot";  – 8 June 1042), traditionally Hardicanute, sometimes referred to as Canute III, was King of Denmark from 1035 to 1042 and King of the English from 1040 to 1042.

Harthacnut was the son of King Cnut the Great (who ruled Denmark, Norway, and England) and Emma of Normandy. When Cnut died in 1035, Harthacnut struggled to retain his father's possessions. Magnus I took control of Norway, but Harthacnut succeeded as King of Denmark and became King of England in 1040 after the death of his half-brother Harold Harefoot, king of England. Harthacnut himself died suddenly in 1042 and was succeeded by Magnus in Denmark and Edward the Confessor in England. Harthacnut was the last Dane to rule England.

Early life
Harthacnut was born shortly after the marriage of his parents in July or August 1017. Cnut had put aside his first wife Ælfgifu of Northampton to marry Emma, and according to the Encomium Emmae Reginae, a book she inspired many years later, Cnut agreed that any sons of their marriage should take precedence over the sons of his first marriage. In 1023, Emma and Harthacnut played a leading role in the translation of the body of the martyr St Ælfheah from London to Canterbury, an occasion seen by Harthacnut's biographer, Ian Howard, as recognition of his position as Cnut's heir in England.

In the 1020s Denmark was threatened by Norway and Sweden, and in 1026 Cnut decided to strengthen its defences by bringing over his eight-year-old son to be the future king under a council headed by his brother-in-law, Earl Ulf. However, Ulf alienated Cnut by getting the Danish provinces to acknowledge Harthacnut as king without reference to Cnut's overall authority and by failing to take vigorous measures to meet Norwegian and Swedish invasions, instead waiting for Cnut's assistance. In 1027, Cnut arrived with a fleet. He forgave Harthacnut his insubordination in view of his youth but had Ulf murdered. He drove the invaders out of Denmark and established his authority over Norway, returning to England in 1028 and leaving Denmark to be ruled by King Harthacnut.

Cnut had left Norway under the rule of Håkon Eiriksson, who drowned in a shipwreck in 1029 or 1030. Cnut then appointed his son Svein to rule Norway with the assistance of Ælfgifu, Cnut's first wife and Svein's mother. However, they made themselves unpopular by heavy taxation and favouring Danish advisers over the Norwegian nobles, and when King Magnus I of Norway, the son of the former King of Norway, Olaf, invaded in 1035, they were forced to flee to Harthacnut's court. Harthacnut was a close ally of Svein, but he did not feel his resources were great enough to launch an invasion of Norway, and the half-brothers looked for help from their father, but instead they received news of his death in November 1035.

Reign

Harold and Denmark
In 1035, Harthacnut succeeded his father on the throne of Denmark as Cnut III. He was unable to come to England in view of the situation in Denmark, and it was agreed that Svein's full brother, Harold Harefoot, should act as regent, with Emma holding Wessex on Harthacnut's behalf. In 1037, Harold was generally accepted as king, Harthacnut being, in the words of the Anglo-Saxon Chronicle, "forsaken because he was too long in Denmark", while Emma fled to Bruges, in Flanders. In 1039, Harthacnut sailed with ten ships to meet his mother in Bruges but delayed an invasion as it was clear Harold was sick and would soon die, which he did in March 1040. Envoys soon crossed the channel to offer Harthacnut the throne.

While the general outline of events following Cnut's death are clear, the details are obscure, and historians give differing interpretations.  states that it is unclear whether Harthacnut was to have England as well as Denmark, but it was probably a reflection of a formal arrangement that mints south of the Thames produced silver pennies in his name, while those to the north were almost all Harold's. There might have been a division of the kingdom if Harthacnut had appeared straight away. He probably stayed in Denmark because of the threat from Magnus of Norway, but they eventually made a treaty by which if either died without an heir, his kingdom would go to the other, and this may have freed Harthacnut to pursue his claim to England.

According to Ian Howard, Harthacnut agreed to help Svein recover Norway and planned an invasion in 1036. Svein died shortly before it was to set out, but Harthacnut proceeded anyway. War was avoided by the treaty between Harthacnut and Magnus, which Harthacnut agreed to because he had no plausible candidate to rule Norway after Svein's death, and he was in any case temperamentally inclined to avoid campaigns and wars. Howard dates the treaty to 1036, whereas other historians date it to 1039 and believe it freed Harthacnut to launch an invasion of England.

Exiled in Bruges, Emma plotted to gain the English throne for her son. She sponsored the Encomium Emmae Reginae, which eulogised her and attacked Harold, especially for arranging the murder of Alfred Atheling (the younger of Emma's two sons by Æthelred) in 1036. The work describes Harthacnut's horror at hearing of his half brother's murder, and in Howard's view, was probably influential in finally persuading the cautious Harthacnut to invade England. According to a later edition of the Encomium, the English took the initiative in communicating with Harthacnut in 1039, possibly when they became aware that Harold had not long to live.

Return to England

Harthacnut travelled to England with his mother. The landing at Sandwich on 17 June 1040, "seven days before Midsummer", was a peaceful one, though he had a fleet of 62 warships. Even though he had been invited to take the throne, he was taking no chances and came as a conqueror with an invasion force. The crews had to be rewarded for their service, and to pay them, he levied a geld of more than 21,000 pounds, a huge sum of money that made him unpopular, although it was only a quarter of the amount his father had raised in similar circumstances in 1017–1018.

Harthacnut had been horrified by Harold's murder of Alfred, and his mother demanded vengeance. With the approval of Harold's former councillors, his body was disinterred from its place of honour at Westminster and publicly beheaded. It was disposed of in a sewer, but then retrieved and thrown in the Thames, from which London shipmen rescued it and had it buried in a churchyard. Godwin, the powerful earl of Wessex, had been complicit in the crime as he had handed over Alfred to Harold, and Queen Emma charged him in a trial before Harthacnut and members of his council. The king allowed Godwin to escape punishment by bringing witnesses that he had acted on Harold's orders, but Godwin then gave Harthacnut a ship so richly decorated that it amounted to the wergild that Godwin would have had to pay if he had been found guilty. Bishop Lyfing of Worcester was also charged with complicity in the crime and deprived of his see, but in 1041 he made his peace with Harthacnut and was restored to his position.

The English had become used to the king ruling in council, with the advice of his chief men, but Harthacnut had ruled autocratically in Denmark, and he was not willing to change, particularly as he did not fully trust the leading earls. At first he was successful intimidating his subjects, though less so later in his short reign. He doubled the size of the English fleet from sixteen to thirty-two ships, partly so that he had a force capable of dealing with trouble elsewhere in his empire, and to pay for it he severely increased the rate of taxation. The increase coincided with a poor harvest, causing severe hardship. In 1041 two of his tax gatherers were so harsh in dealing with people in and around Worcester that they rioted and killed the tax gatherers. Harthacnut reacted by imposing a then-legal but very unpopular punishment known as 'harrying'. He ordered his earls to burn the town and kill the population. Few people were killed, as the people of Worcester had fled in advance of their arrival. Although the city was burnt and plundered, citizens of Worcester who had taken refuge on an island in the River Severn fought successfully against Harthacnut's troops, and won the right to return to their homes without further punishment.

The earl of Northumbria was Siward, but Earl Eadwulf of Bamburgh ruled the northern part in semi-independence, a situation which did not please the autocratic Harthacnut. In 1041 Earl Eadwulf gave offence to the king for an unknown reason but then sought reconciliation. Harthacnut promised him safe conduct but then colluded in his murder by Siward, who became earl of the whole of Northumbria. The crime was widely condemned, and the Anglo-Saxon Chronicle described it as "a betrayal" and the king as an "oath-breaker".

Harthacnut was generous to the church. Very few contemporary documents survive, but a royal charter of his transferred land to Bishop Ælfwine of Winchester, and he made several grants to Ramsey Abbey. The 12th-century Ramsey Chronicle speaks well of his generosity and of his character.

Harthacnut had suffered from bouts of illness even before he became King of England. He may have suffered from tuberculosis, and he probably knew that he had not long to live. In 1041 he invited his half-brother Edward the Confessor (his mother Emma's son by Æthelred the Unready) back from exile in Normandy and probably made him his heir. He may well have been influenced by Emma, who hoped to keep her power by ensuring that one of her sons was succeeded by another. Harthacnut was unmarried and had no known children.

Death
On 8 June 1042, Harthacnut attended a wedding in Lambeth. The groom was Tovi the Proud, former standard-bearer to Cnut, and the bride was Gytha, daughter of the courtier Osgod Clapa. Harthacnut presumably consumed large quantities of alcohol. As he was drinking to the health of the bride, he "died as he stood at his drink, and he suddenly fell to the earth with an awful convulsion; and those who were close by took hold of him, and he spoke no word afterwards..." The likely cause of death was a stroke, "brought about by an excessive intake of alcohol".

Sten Körner noted that the death of Harthacnut could be part of a plot, but did not further explore the notion, though the implication would be that Edward the Confessor was behind this plot. Brewer points out that Edward benefited from the sudden death of Harthacnut and that while Godwin, Earl of Wessex, was the father-in-law to Edward, he had once led an uprising against his son-in-law. He died suddenly after dining with said son-in-law, again pointing suspicion at Edward as the probable culprit behind both deaths. Katherine Holman was certain that Harthacnut was poisoned but felt that the culprit will never be known with certainty due to "no shortage of discontented candidates".

Succession

The political agreement between Harthacnut and Magnus the Good included the appointment of the latter as heir to Harthacnut. At the time, the agreement would have only affected the throne of Denmark. The Heimskringla reports that when Harthacnut died, Magnus extended his claim to England. He reportedly sent a letter to Edward the Confessor, pressing his claim to the English throne and threatening invasion. His own heir, Harald Hardrada, would also press this claim. Both considered themselves legal heirs to Harthacnut. The Fagrskinna contains a scene where Magnus proclaims that "I will take possession of all the Danish empire or else die in the attempt."

According to the Encomium, Edward the Confessor already served as co-ruler of England since 1041. There is an emphasis on Harthacnut, Edward, and Emma serving as a trinity of rulers, in emulation of the Holy Trinity. Edward, by surviving his co-ruler, would be king by default. The Heimskringla depicts Edward portraying himself as brother and legal heir to both Harold Harefoot and Harthacnut, while pointing out that he had already won the support "of all the people of the country". Unstated in both is that the marriage of Edward to Edith of Wessex would also support his claim by earning him both the political support of her father Godwin and an additional connection to Cnut. She was a niece to the king. The Fagrskinna has Edward point out that he was the son of Æthelred the Unready and Emma of Normandy, the half-brother to Edmund Ironside, the stepson of Cnut, the stepbrother of Harold Harefoot, and the half-brother of Harthacnut. In short, he had a much stronger family claim to the throne than Magnus. All the leaders of England had already acknowledged him as their king, and he was consecrated by an archbishop. England was his own heritage. Whether Magnus managed to defeat him in war or not, "you can never be called king in England, and you will never be granted any allegiance there before you put an end to my life." This was supposedly enough to cause Magnus to doubt the strength of his own claim.

The marriage agreement between Gunhilda of Denmark (sister of Harthacnut) and Henry III, Holy Roman Emperor would allow descendants of this marriage to claim the throne of Denmark and potentially of England. The marriage, from Henry's perspective, was probably orchestrated to allow the Holy Roman Empire to claim control of Denmark and the western areas of the Baltic Sea. However, Gunhilda died in 1038 with no known sons. Her only daughter was Beatrice I, Abbess of Quedlinburg, who never married.

Reputation

Apart from the Ramsey Chronicle, medieval sources are hostile to Harthacnut. According to the Anglo-Saxon Chronicle he "did nothing worthy of a king as long as he ruled." Modern historians are less dismissive. In the view of M. K. Lawson, he had at least two of the requisites of a successful medieval king: he was "both ruthless and feared"; had he not died young, the Norman Conquest might not have happened. Ian Howard praises Harthacnut for keeping peace throughout his empire, benefiting trade and merchants, and ensuring a peaceful succession by inviting Edward to his court as his heir. Had he lived longer, Howard believes, his character might have enabled him to become a successful king like his father.

Henry of Huntingdon (12th century) claimed that Harthacnut ordered for the dining tables of his court to be "laid four times a day with royal sumptuousness" which O'Brien says is likely a popular myth. Henry of Huntingdon viewed this detail in the context of the monarch sharing these meals with the members of his household, making Harthacnut more generous than his own contemporaries, who "through avarice, or as they pretend through disgust, ...set but one meal a day before their dependents". His account produced the image of Harthacnut as a "very generous bon viveur." Ranulf Higden (14th century) viewed the same detail in a negative light. He claimed that Harthacnut insisted on having two dinners and two suppers per day. His example influenced the English people, who supposedly were to Higden's day gluttonous and extravagant. Higden so claimed that Harthacnut had a lasting effect on the English national character. The association of Harthacnut with gluttony was well known enough to appear in the novel Ivanhoe (1819) by Walter Scott. The character Cedric comments on his friend Athelstane, whose main character trait is a love for food and drink, that "The soul of Hardicanute hath taken possession of him, and he hath no pleasure save to fill, to swill, and to call for more."

The Knýtlinga saga treats the death of Harthacnut as the end of an ancient line of kings, and notes that he was the last Danish king to rule over England. But otherwise Harthacnut is treated as a mere footnote in the line of monarchs, while there are many observations on Cnut. The Morkinskinna covers Harthacnut's death in some detail, but records next to nothing about his life, suggesting a lack of memorable details on him, presumably due to his short reign.

The Brut Chronicle was an Anglo-Norman work, covering British and English monarchs from Brut (Brutus of Troy) to the death of Henry III in 1272. It was probably written during the reign of Edward I (reigned 1272–1307), though the oldest surviving manuscript dates to 1338. The text often includes notable errors. The original author remains unknown, but there were a number of continuations by different hands, continuing the story to the Battle of Halidon Hill (1333). The material on Harthacnut is largely positive. The author considered both Harold Harefoot and Harthacnut to have been sons of Cnut and Emma of Normandy. He portrays Harold as lacking in chivalry, courtesy, and honour. While Harthacnut was "...a noble knight and stalwart of body, and he greatly loved knighthood and all virtues."  He praises Harthacnut for his generosity with food and drink, claiming that his table was open "...for all who wished to come to his court to be richly served with royal dishes". He concludes by portraying Harthacnut as a loyal son for accepting his mother, Emma, back to court.

Contradictory account of his death

There is a contradictory account of Harthacnut's death featured in the Morkinskinna (13th century). According to this account, Magnus I of Norway (reigned 1034–1047) visited the court of Harthacnut in Denmark, received with all official honours. The two monarchs then argued on a matter of etiquette, on whether the host or the guest should drink first, each man offering the honour to the other. The two eventually agreed that the host should drink first. Then Álfífa (Ælfgifu of Northampton) entered the royal hall, welcoming Magnus. She poured a drink for him. But the guest offered the drink to Harthacnut. He drank from the drinking horn and fell dead, poisoned. Álfífa had thus intended to poison Magnus, but accidentally killed Harthacnut instead. She fled to escape punishment.

The tale is probably fictional in origin, though consistent with the villainous depiction of Ælfgifu in this work. A nearly identical story appears in the Egils saga, though the three protagonists are different, with Egill Skallagrímsson as the intended victim, with Bárðr of Atley and Gunnhild, Mother of Kings as the would-be poisoners.

References

Notes

Citations

Sources

 Based primarily on Einarsson's 1984 edition.

Further reading

DeVries, Kelly, The Norwegian Invasion of England in 1066 (2003). Boydell & Brewer Ltd, 
Douglas, David Charles, William The Conqueror: The Norman Impact Upon England (1964). University of California Press.
Gillingham, John, The introduction of chivalry into England. Essay included in Law and Government in Medieval England and Normandy: Essays in Honour of Sir James Holt (1994), pages 31–56. Cambridge University Press, 
Howard, Ian, Harold II: a Throne-Worthy King. Essay included in King Harold II and the Bayeux Tapestry (2005), pages 35–52. Boydell Press, .
 Rushton, Alan R., Royal Maladies: Inherited Diseases in the Royal Houses of Europe (2008). Victoria, British Columbia: Trafford,

External links

 Hardicanute at the official website of the British monarchy
 

1010s births
1042 deaths
11th-century English monarchs
11th-century kings of Denmark
Anglo-Norse monarchs
Burials at Winchester Cathedral
Christian monarchs
Cnut the Great
House of Knýtlinga
Monarchs of England before 1066
Simony